USS Verna & Esther (SP-1187) was a United States Navy patrol vessel in commission from 1917 to 1918.

Verna & Esther was built as a private wooden-hulled, single-screw motorboat of the same name in 1912 at Kennebunk, Maine. On 6 August 1917, the U.S. Navy acquired her under a free lease from her owner, Ensign F. K. Williams of Provincetown, Massachusetts, for use as a section patrol boat during World War I. She was commissioned on 10 September 1917 as USS Verna & Esther (SP-1187).

Assigned to the 1st Naval District in northern New England, Verna & Esther served as a target range boat through the end of World War I.

The Navy returned Verna & Esther to Williams on 30 November 1918.

References

NavSource Online: Section Patrol Craft Photo Archive Verna & Esther (SP 1187)

Patrol vessels of the United States Navy
World War I patrol vessels of the United States
Ships built in Kennebunk, Maine
1912 ships